La Martre is a municipality in the Gaspésie-Îles-de-la-Madeleine region of the province of Quebec in Canada.

In addition to La Martre itself, the municipality also includes the communities of Cap-au-Renard, Christie, and Sainte-Marthe-de-Gaspé.

History

The area saw permanent settlement in the late 19th century and was originally called Rivière-à-la-Marthe, after the Marten River (French: Rivière à la Marthe) that flows into the Gulf of Saint Lawrence there. The marten is found along this river's banks and is abundant in the Gaspé region.

In 1923, the place separated from the municipality of Sainte-Anne-des-Monts to form the Township Municipality of Christie, named in honour of Robert Christie. In 1950, the township municipality was split in two when Marsoui was incorporated as a village municipality.

In 1970, the municipality was renamed to La Martre.

Demographics

Population

Gallery

See also
 List of municipalities in Quebec

References 

Incorporated places in Gaspésie–Îles-de-la-Madeleine
Municipalities in Quebec